Woodhill Road Halt was a stopping point on the Bury to Holcombe Brook Line from 1905 until 1918 and from 1934 until the line closed in 1952.

History
The line from Bury to  had opened on 6 November 1882, and originally there were three intermediate stations. A service of steam railmotors was introduced on the line in July 1905, and four more intermediate stations were opened at the same time; these small stations, or halts, included one at Woodhill Road,  from Bury, which opened on 3 July 1905, but closed on 1 April 1918. It was reopened on 2 April 1934, and closed permanently with the end of passenger services on the line on 5 May 1952.

References

Lost Railways of Lancashire by Gordon Suggitt

External links
Woodhill Road Halt on navigable 1948 O.S. map

Disused railway stations in the Metropolitan Borough of Bury
Former Lancashire and Yorkshire Railway stations
Railway stations in Great Britain opened in 1905
Railway stations in Great Britain closed in 1918
Railway stations in Great Britain opened in 1934
Railway stations in Great Britain closed in 1952